Veli-Matti Vittasmäki (born July 3, 1990) is a Finnish professional ice hockey player who currently plays for Tappara in the Liiga.

Vittasmäki joined Severstal Cherepovets after playing the previous three seasons with Tappara of the Finnish Liiga. He agreed to a one-year contract with the Russian club, leaving Finland for the first time in his 12-year professional career on 1 May 2020.

After a lone season in the KHL, Vittasmäki returned to former club, Tappara of the Liiga, agreeing to a three-year contract on 19 May 2021.

References

External links

1990 births
Living people
Finnish ice hockey defencemen
Ilves players
KalPa players
Severstal Cherepovets players
Tappara players
HC TPS players
TuTo players
Sportspeople from Turku